Čemernica (Serbian Cyrillic: Чемерница) is a mountain in western Serbia, near the town of Ivanjica.

References

Mountains of Serbia